Angerton is a village in the civil parish of Holme East Waver in Cumbria, United Kingdom.

See also

Listed buildings in Holme East Waver

References

Villages in Cumbria
Allerdale